Kenneth John Ball (16 May 1889 – 16 January 1958) was an English cricketer. Ball was a right-handed batsman whose bowling style is unknown. He was born at Northampton, Northamptonshire.

Ball made his first-class debut for Northamptonshire against Essex in the 1921 County Championship at the County Ground, Northampton. He made eleven further first-class appearances for the county in 1921, the last of which came against Warwickshire. In his twelve first-class matches for Northamptonshire, he scored a total of 178 runs at an average of 8.47, with a high score of 49. With the ball, he took 13 wickets at a bowling average of 29.53, with best figures of 4/52.

He died at the town of his birth on 16 January 1958.

References

External links
Kenneth Ball at ESPNcricinfo
Kenneth Ball at CricketArchive

1889 births
1958 deaths
Cricketers from Northampton
English cricketers
Northamptonshire cricketers